Master of the World (real name Eshu) is a supervillain appearing in American comic books published by Marvel Comics. He is a recurring villain of the superhero team Alpha Flight.

Publication history

Master of the World first appeared in Alpha Flight #2 and was created by John Byrne.

Fictional character biography
Forty thousand years ago, a caveman warrior named Eshu was cast out of his tribe in what is now northern Asia after he killed another caveman against his tribe's laws. He wanders the Earth and is soon psionically called to the beacon of an alien ship.

The ship was owned by the Plodex race. After it crashed on the North Pole, it sent out a message, to seek out the dominant life form on Earth. After an exhausting journey, the hunter Eshu finds the ship and is captured upon entering it. For thousands of years Eshu was experimented on by the Plodex ship. The experiments were excruciating. He was dissected and reassembled, just to be dissected again. His intelligence increased over the years until his mind and body were developed to the peak of perfection. After some time he learned to tap into the ship's systems with his mind, which eventually enables him to take them all over. He finds he is actually unable to leave the ship. He sends out a signal to a member of the Plodex race called Marrina. She responds and brings the superhero team Alpha Flight with her to his starship base in the Arctic. By this time, Eshu is calling himself The Master of the World. He took Marrina captive, and revealed his origin. He was confronted by Namor the Sub-Mariner and the Invisible Woman, and his starship exploded during the confrontation with Alpha Flight. His plans succeed and the Master is able to escape the ship by submarine.

He was no longer bound to the alien ship and sought to be a conqueror, but in order to execute his plans for world domination, he would still need the ship's technology. Using his knowledge of the alien technologies, he gains control of Marrina and her Plodex Mate. The Master caused Marrina to revert to savagery, and captured Namor and Alpha Flight's Puck. The Master plotted to destroy the Atlanteans. His helmet was torn from his head by Puck, severely injuring him; the upper half of his head was severely scarred due to Puck's forcible removal of his helmet, which had been physically joined to his flesh. The Master's submarine exploded, thwarting his plans to dominate the world.

It turned out that he escaped, and in order to preserve his body, entered a state of suspended animation. He was revived from that state by Llan the Sorcerer. With the help of enzymes from the corpse of Scramble, the Mixed Up Man, the resulting mutagenic fluid rebuilds his body to a perfect human specimen. His next plan was to take over the Canadian government with the alias Joshua Lord, because of the chaos that was triggered by the Super Power Registration Act. During that time The Master reforms Omega Flight to stop Alpha Flight from getting in his way. The Master finds James MacDonald Hudson entrapped in some sort of dimensional limbo. He returns him from the dead as The Antiguard, in order for The Guardian to kill Alpha Flight and his wife. However, The Guardian, with the help of his wife Heather Hudson, managed to break out of the Master's mental control. The Master seemingly kills himself to avoid prison.

He returns, to cross paths with Heroes for Hire and the mercenary team headed by Silver Sable. One of his goals was to kill Iron Fist. This is because the mystical land of K'un Lun, which manifests where Iron Fist is, poses a threat to his plans. He again apparently kills himself, but his death was proven false again.

He appears during the "Kang Dynasty" storyline, where Marrina is glimpsed inside a stasis tube in his laboratory. His alien technology is used in an attempt to protect the cities of the world, but this does not stop earth from being conquered. The Master seemingly dies again, at the hands of Warbird, when she kills him so that the Avengers can use his weapons to help attack Kang the Conqueror's forces. Although Warbird requested that she be tried for the Master's death, a tribunal headed by Captain America concluded that there would be no punishment, as Warbird was acting as a soldier during a time of war as well as an Avenger, and had simply taken the only available course of action at a time when timing was critical and no alternatives were available.

During the "Fear Itself" storyline, it was revealed that Master of the World was behind the motives of the Unity Party which targeted Alpha Flight. When Alpha Flight had escaped from Department H, he used his powers to have Vindicator and Department H assemble Alpha Strike (consisting of Persuasion, Ranark, a Wendigo, and a brainwashed Citadel) to spread the "Unity" program and take down Alpha Flight. He even introduces himself to a kidnapped Kyle Jinadu. At the end of the Alpha Flight 2011 series, he is killed once again in a final battle with Alpha Flight.

During the "Civil War II" storyline, Master of the World somehow turned up alive and assumed the alias of Phillipe Beaulieu where he worked on the Board of Governors for the Alpha Flight Space Program representing Canada. Master of the World planned to corrupt the evidence in order to isolate Captain Marvel and gain control of the justice system. When it is discovered that Aurora was framed and Captain Marvel confront Philllipe Beaulieu, he sheds his disguise revealing himself to be Master of the World. Empowering himself with Thundersword's sword from the evidence lockup, Master of the World fought Captain Marvel, where the fight took them to a bar. The former villain Thundersword showed up and reclaimed his sword enough for Captain Marvel to subdue Master of the World.

Powers and abilities
The Master of the World is approximately 40,000 years old. After he was experimented on by the Plodex ship, he underwent the reconstruction of his entire body (except for his brain) by Plodex technology, granting him superhuman powers. The master has the agility beyond that of a normal human, which he gained after he altered his body. He has enhanced reflexes, that were fast enough to slice Warbird with a sword. His speed can reach 61–. His stamina is so high that he can sustain peak physical exertion for several hours before fatigue impairs performance. Also, his strength is enhanced, and he was able to break Sasquatch's arm by, after dodging Sasquatch's attack, grabbing it with both hands and breaking it. He is also a master of hand-to-hand combat, as he learned the techniques 40,000 years ago, retaining his knowledge of hand-to-hand combat from his days as a tribal warrior. He knows all human pressure points, which was shown when he knocked out Namor the Sub-Mariner with a single punch. The Master is virtually immortal, having lived for forty thousand years; although not invulnerable, he ages at a very slow rate. The Master was once mentally integrated with his Plodex starship base, so that he was physically unable to leave it until it was destroyed in a conflict with Alpha Flight. He then underwent further reconstruction of his entire body by a mutagenic fluid concocted from the remains of Scramble the Mixed-Up Man.

His suit also has many benefits, allowing him teleportation and flight. His helmet and battlesuit are composed of an unknown metal, including cybernetic mesh enabling the Master to control Plodex technology through mental commands. Devices within the Master’s helmet and battlesuit enable him to cast illusions disguising his appearance. He is able to create a force field that can ward off attacks. Also, he is able to shoot energy blasts with his suit, and it enables him to disperse electromagnetism, which was shown when he was able to control Guardian I's suit. The Master designed this battlesuit using his knowledge of Plodex technology. He is self-educated in all recorded knowledge of Earth humanity up to the present, and of the alien Plodex (as of forty thousand years ago) through mental linkage with computers in the starship base. He has utilized various skycraft and underwater craft.

References

 The Official Handbook of the Marvel Universe – Master Edition #13

External links
 
 Master at MarvelDirectory.com
 Master at Alphanex

Characters created by John Byrne (comics)
Comics characters introduced in 1983
Fictional characters with superhuman durability or invulnerability
Marvel Comics characters who can move at superhuman speeds
Marvel Comics characters with superhuman strength
Marvel Comics mutates
Marvel Comics supervillains